Pedro del Hierro also known as Del Hierro is a Spanish fabrics and clothing company specialising in high-end, luxury cashmere and wool products, stablished in 1974 by Spanish designer Pedro del Hierro.

References

Fashion accessory brands
High fashion brands
Cosmetics brands
Perfume houses
Shoe companies of Spain
Companies based in Madrid
Clothing companies established in 1974
Spanish brands